Julia Nagele (born Dec. 4, 1971) is a designer and educator. She serves as the director of design and a principal at HEWITT, a Seattle-based architecture firm. Julia is an affiliate assistant professor at the University of Washington in the architecture department. Known for her work designing skyscrapers, Julia's recently completed Emerald is the ninth-tallest tower in the world designed by a woman.

Biography 
Nagele graduated Cum Laude with a Bachelor of Architecture degree from Lehigh University in Bethlehem, Penn., in 1994. She completed her Master of Architecture degree from the University of Maryland in 1996, and was awarded the Dean's Thesis Prize. She started her career with Ayers/Saint/Gross Architects in Pennsylvania before moving to Seattle. Nagele spent time at LMN Architects and owned her own business prior to joining HEWITT in 2011. She was named a principal and the director of design – architecture in 2018. Nagele's Emerald Tower, the tallest residential building on the west coast designed by a woman, was called “city’s most highly-anticipated luxury condominium” by Dwell magazine. Her Mama Tower, slated to begin construction in 2022, will reach 484 feet, while her 32-story Skyglass broke ground in 2021. Many of Nagele's projects feature complex urban conditions, where she “relishes creating spaces for
unplanned connections, allowing people and ideas to cross paths.” Nagele is a frequent panelist and committee member, including AIA's Women in Design.

Notable Projects 
 The Emerald (122 Stewart Street), Seattle, WA
 Skyglass (222 Dexter), Seattle, WA
 Mama Tower (1516 2nd Avenue), Seattle, WA
 Capitol Hill Station Transit-Oriented Development, Seattle, WA
 Gridiron (590 1st Ave S), Seattle, WA
 888 Bellevue, (888 108th Ave NE) Bellevue, WA
 Excelsior (1535 Bellevue Ave), Seattle, WA 
 The Luna (2749 California Ave SW), Seattle, WA
 The LeeAnn Apartments (701 5th Ave North), Seattle, WA
 Verve (2720 4th Ave), Seattle, WA
 Rubix (515 Harvard Ave E), Seattle, WA

References 

20th-century American architects
1971 births
Living people
21st-century American architects
Lehigh University alumni
University System of Maryland alumni